The Savannah Women of Vision investiture, created by Savannah College of Art and Design (SCAD) President and Founder Paula Wallace, commemorates women of notable altruistic and intellectual achievement from Savannah, Georgia. The first induction was in 2016 at SCAD Arnold Hall, and has continued biennially.

About the investiture
The origins of the Savannah Women of Vision investiture can be traced to the proscenium in the university's historic Arnold Hall, anchored by a New Deal-era mural that depicts Savannah's historical leaders: Button Gwinnett, Nathanael Greene, George Whitefield, and Casimir Pulaski, among others. Wallace noticed the omission of women in this visual depiction of the notable citizens of Savannah. As Wallace explains, "Savannah as we know it rests on the triumphs of its women — mothers, entrepreneurs, authors, patriots, philanthropists. I created the Savannah Women of Vision investiture to illuminate trailblazers and their transcendent work, keeping their names and deeds not only in our hearts but publicly acclaimed. These are our heroines."

Inductees

About the reliefs
To commemorate the Savannah Women of Vision and their impact on the community, SCAD commissioned alumnus Michael Porten to create large relief portraits of the honorees. Although the portraits are executed in classic bas-relief — a style of portraiture perfected by the ancient Greeks — Porten uses advanced tools and software to render each woman's visage in sculpture, infusing a classic medium with modern technology. The gilded finish holds meaning, as gold traditionally represents generosity and compassion.

References

External links
Savannah Women of Vision

Women's halls of fame
Lists of American women
State halls of fame in the United States
Lists of people from Georgia (U.S. state)
 
Halls of fame in Georgia (U.S. state)
History of women in Georgia (U.S. state)
Culture of Savannah, Georgia